Calamaria griswoldi, known commonly as the dwarf reed snake or the lined reed snake,  is a species of snake in the family Colubridae.

Etymology
The specific name, griswoldi, is in honor of American ornithologist John Augustus Griswold Jr. (1912–1991), who collected the holotype.

Geographic range
C. griswoldi is found in Malaysia.

Description
C. griswoldi is a small species.

Reproduction
C. griswoldi is oviparous.

References

Further reading
Loveridge A (1938). "New Snakes of the Genera Calamaria, Bungarus, and Trimeresurus from Mount Kinabalu, North Borneo". Proc. Biol. Soc. Washington 51: 43–46. (Calamaria lumbricoidea griswoldi, new subspecies, pp. 43–44).
Marx H, Inger RF (1955). "Notes on Snakes of the Genus Calamaria ". Fieldiana Zool. 37 (7): 167–209. (Calamaria griswoldi, new status, pp. 183–185).

External links

Reptiles described in 1938
Reptiles of Malaysia
Colubrids
Calamaria
Reptiles of Borneo